Flagelliphantes is a genus of dwarf spiders that was first described by Michael I. Saaristo & A. V. Tanasevitch in 1996.  it contains only three species, all found in Russia: F. bergstromi, F. flagellifer, and F. sterneri.

See also
 List of Linyphiidae species (A–H)

References

Araneomorphae genera
Linyphiidae
Palearctic spiders
Spiders of Russia